Robert Brooke Dashiell ( – ) was an officer in the United States Navy who was noted for his technical expertise.

Dashiell, born  near Woodville, Virginia, graduated from the United States Naval Academy in 1881 and was commissioned as an ensign two years later.

In 1889, he received an honorary Master of Arts degree from St. John's College in Annapolis, Maryland.

After his appointment as Assistant Naval Constructor, Dashiell was dispatched by the Bureau of Ordnance to construct an ordnance center at Indian Head, Maryland. The resulting facility, the U.S. Navy's first installation in Southern Maryland, has been in the forefront of naval ordnance development and testing for the United States. He served as Inspector in Charge of Ordnance there from 1890 to 1893.

An inventor of important ordnance mechanisms and an authority on dock construction, he was commissioned Assistant Naval Constructor  and served in his specialty until his death in Washington, D.C., .

Namesake
In 1943, the destroyer USS Dashiell (DD-659) was named in his honor. The USS Dashiell was commissioned 20 March 1943.

References

1860 births
1899 deaths
United States Naval Academy alumni
United States Navy officers
American marine engineers
People from Woodville, Virginia
Engineers from Virginia